, Greek regional airline Olympic Air serves the following 31 destinations:

Destinations

References

Lists of airline destinations